Buddhist atomism is a school of atomistic Buddhist philosophy that flourished on the Indian subcontinent during two major periods. During the first phase, which began to develop prior to the 6th century CE, Buddhist atomism had a very qualitative, Aristotelian-style atomic theory. This form of atomism identifies four kinds of atoms, corresponding to the standard elements. Each of these elements has a specific property, such as solidity or motion, and performs a specific function in mixtures, such as providing support or causing growth.  Like the Hindus and Jains, the Buddhists were able to integrate a theory of atomism with their logical presuppositions. 

According to Noa Ronkin, this kind of atomism was developed in the Sarvastivada and Sautrantika schools for whom material reality can be: reduced to discrete momentary atoms, namely, the four primary elements. These momentary atoms, through their spatial arrangement and by their concatenation with prior and posterior atoms of the same type, create the illusion of persisting things as they appear in our everyday experience. Atomic reality is thus understood first and foremost as change, though not in the sense of a thing x transforming into y. That is, change itself is the very nature of atomic reality rather than its being made of enduring substances the qualities of which undergo change. Atoms that appear to endure are, in fact, a series of momentary events that ascend and fall in rapid succession and in accordance with causal relations. Unlike the atoms of the Vaifesika, the atoms of the Sarvastivada-Vaibhasika and the Sautrantika are not permanent: they come into being and cease from one moment to the next going through a process of birth, continuance, decay and destruction. Yet the material compounds that consist of these atoms are real, if only in the minimal, phenomenological sense.The second phase of Buddhist atomism, which flourished in the 7th century CE, was very different from the first. Indian Buddhist philosophers, including Dharmakirti and Dignāga, considered atoms to be point-sized, durationless, and made of energy. In discussing Buddhist atomism, Stcherbatsky writes:

See also
Atomism
Dharmakirti
Dignaga
Kalapas
Mereological nihilism

Notes

References
 Stcherbatsky, F. Th. 1962 (1930). Buddhist Logic. Volume 1. New York: Dover.
 
 Karunadasa, Y. (1967). Buddhist analysis of matter, Colombo : Dept. of Cultural Affairs
 Majumdar, Pradip Kr (2002). The Bauddha Atomism, 佛學與科學 (= Buddhism and Science), 3 (2), 65-67
 Gangopadhyaya, Mrinalkanti (1980). Indian atomism : history and sources, Calcutta : K.P. Bagchi
 

Atomism
Buddhist philosophy